Cissus (from Greek kissos, ivy) may refer to:

In Ancient Greece 
 Cissus (Mygdonia) a town and mountain in Macedon
 Cissus (Cappadocia) a town in ancient Cappadocia, now in Turkey
 Cissus the messenger who announced to Alexander the flight of Harpalus
 Cissus, a figure in Greek mythology

In Botany 
 Cissus a genus of woody Climbers (Vitaceae)

See also 
 Kissos municipality of Thessaly